Gelugor Highway, Federal Route 6 comprising Jalan Gelugor and Jalan Sultan Azlan Shah, is a major highway in Penang, Malaysia.

List of interchanges

Highways in Malaysia
Expressways and highways in Penang
Roads in Penang